Paul Lambrichts (born 16 October 1954, Lanklaar) is a retired Belgian footballer.

During his career he played for Lanklaar V.V., Patro-Eisden, F.C. Winterslag, K.S.K. Beveren, R. Standard de Liège and K.V.V. Overpelt. He earned 5 caps for the Belgium national football team, and participated in UEFA Euro 1984.

References
Royal Belgian Football Association: Number of caps

1954 births
Living people
Belgian footballers
Belgium international footballers
UEFA Euro 1984 players
K.F.C. Winterslag players
K.S.K. Beveren players
Standard Liège players
Belgian Pro League players
People from Dilsen-Stokkem
Association football defenders
Footballers from Limburg (Belgium)